"Lacrimosa" is a song recorded by Dominican singer Juan Luis Guerra for his seventh studio album, Fogarate (1994), included as its seventh track. It was released to radio stations in Europe in 1994 and the United States in 1995 by Karen Records as a promotional single, following "Los Pajaritos". The track is a bachata that attempts an interpretation of Mozart's Requiem.

Track listing 

 Europe CD-single (1994)
 Lacrimosa – 3:20
 Los Parajitos – 4:02

Charts

References 

1994 songs
Juan Luis Guerra songs